"They Don't Know" is a song by New Zealand musicians Savage and Aaradhna, released on 3 October 2005 as the third and final single from Savage's debut solo album, Moonshine (2005). The single peaked at number three in New Zealand and number 26 in Australia. It was New Zealand's 48th-most-successful single on 2005.

Track listings
New Zealand CD single
 "They Don't Know" (radio edit)
 "They Don't Know" (instrumental)
 "They Don't Know" (a cappella)

Australian CD single
 "They Don't Know" (radio edit)
 "They Don't Know" (original version)
 "They Don't Know" (Bass Kleph remix)
 "They Don't Know" (a cappella)

Charts

Weekly charts

Year-end charts

Release history

References

2005 singles
2005 songs
Aaradhna songs
Savage (rapper) songs
Universal Music Group singles